Nākahi Facula is a bright, irregular depression on the surface of Mercury, located at 52.7° S, 342.2° W.  It was named by the IAU in 2018.  Nākahi is the Māori word for snake.

Nākahi Facula is located southeast of Amaru Facula.  The irregular depressions in both suggest they are probably volcanic vents.

Both faculae are in the Debussy quadrangle and are roughly south of Debussy crater.

References

Surface features of Mercury